Escuela para suegras ("School for Stepmothers") is a 1958 Mexican film directed by Gilberto Martínez Solares. It was produced by Fernando de Fuentes and adapted from the play by Sixto Pondal Ríos.

Cast
 Germán Valdés - (as Tin Tan German Valdes)
 Martha Mijares		
 Blanca de Castejón		
 Óscar Pulido		
 Prudencia Grifell - (as Prudencia Griffel)
 Julio Monterde		
 Marcelo Chávez - (as Marcelo)
 Pompín Iglesias		
 Eduardo Alcaraz - (as Eduardo Arcaraz)
 Óscar Ortiz de Pinedo		
 Joaquín García Vargas - (as Borolas)
 Jorgito Kreutzmann - (as Jorge Kreutzman)
 Altia Michel		
 Nacho Contla - (as Ignacio Contla) Magda Monzón

External links
 

1958 films
Mexican comedy films
1950s Spanish-language films
1950s Mexican films